WGTM may refer to:

 WGTM (AM), a defunct radio station (1520 AM) formerly licensed to serve Spindale, North Carolina, United States
 WGTM (defunct), a defunct radio station (590 AM) formerly licensed to serve Wilson, North Carolina